The Munich U-Bahn is a public rapid transit system serving the city of Munich and surrounding communities. The system is operated by the Münchner Verkehrsgesellschaft (MVG, "Munich Transport Company") and served over 375 million passengers per year in 2012.

The Munich U-Bahn currently has 100 stations (if four connecting/transfer stations are counted twice; there are 96 stations counting all stations once): 94 are underground and 6 are on the surface or elevated.  Only three stations are located outside the Munich city limits: Garching, Garching-Forschungszentrum, and Garching-Hochbrück are all located in the northern suburb of Garching.

Stations

References 
Specific

General
  www.u-bahn-muenchen.de

 
Munich U-Bahn
U-bahn
U-bahn